Aristotelia zetetica is a moth of the family Gelechiidae. It was described by Edward Meyrick in 1934. It is found in southern India.

References

Moths described in 1934
Aristotelia (moth)
Moths of Asia
Taxa named by Edward Meyrick